Baldomero Perlaza Perlaza (born 25 June 1992) is a Colombian professional footballer who plays as a midfielder for Argentine Primera División club Colón.

Career statistics

Club

1 Includes Superliga Colombiana, Recopa Sudamericana and Suruga Bank Championship.

Honours

Club 
Santa Fe
Copa Sudamericana       :2015
Superliga Colombiana    :2015

References

External links 

1992 births
Living people
Colombian footballers
Colombian expatriate footballers
Association football midfielders
Sportspeople from Valle del Cauca Department
2021 Copa América players
Categoría Primera A players
Categoría Primera B players
Argentine Primera División players
Cortuluá footballers
Atlético Huila footballers
Cúcuta Deportivo footballers
Boyacá Chicó F.C. footballers
Independiente Santa Fe footballers
Atlético Nacional footballers
Club Atlético Colón footballers
Colombian expatriate sportspeople in Argentina
Expatriate footballers in Argentina